State Route 241 (SR 241) is a  southwest-northeast state highway located in the southwestern part of the U.S. state of Georgia. It exists entirely within Decatur County.

Route description
SR 241 begins at the Florida state line in southern Decatur County, where the roadway continues as County Road 65 (Attapulgus Highway). It heads east-northeast to an intersection with SR 309 (Fowlstown Road). Then, the road curves to the northeast, crossing over Little Attapulgus Creek and a CSX Transportation railroad line. It then heads north-northeast, until it enters Attapulgus, where it meets its northern terminus, an intersection with US 27 Business/SR 1 Business. Here, the roadway continues as Main Street.

No section of SR 241 is part of the National Highway System, a system of routes determined to be the most important for the nation's economy, mobility and defense.

History
SR 241 was established in 1946 along the same alignment as it runs today. Approximately half the route was paved. By 1948, the remainder of the highway was paved.

Major intersections

See also

References

External links

241
Transportation in Decatur County, Georgia